The Orlando Florida Temple is the 48th constructed and 46th operating temple of the Church of Jesus Christ of Latter-day Saints (LDS Church).  Located near Windermere, Florida, it was built with a modern single-spire design.  It is the second largest LDS temple in the Eastern United States, after the Washington D.C. Temple.

History
The LDS temple in Orlando, Florida was announced on April 6, 1991, with a groundbreaking on June 20, 1992. The temple was dedicated on October 9, 1994, by Howard W. Hunter, LDS Church president. Orlando is one of two temples dedicated by Hunter, the other is the Bountiful Utah Temple.

In 2015, a second temple was dedicated in Florida, the Fort Lauderdale Florida Temple was built in Davie, Florida, and serves an estimated 25,000 church members in South Florida.

In 2020, the Orlando Florida Temple was closed in response to the coronavirus pandemic.

Gallery

See also

 Comparison of temples of The Church of Jesus Christ of Latter-day Saints
 List of temples of The Church of Jesus Christ of Latter-day Saints
 List of temples of The Church of Jesus Christ of Latter-day Saints by geographic region
 Temple architecture (Latter-day Saints)
 The Church of Jesus Christ of Latter-day Saints in Florida

References

External links

Orlando Florida Temple at ChurchofJesusChristTemples.org

Temples (LDS Church) in Florida
Buildings and structures in Orlando, Florida
Christianity in Orlando, Florida
Religious buildings and structures completed in 1994
1994 establishments in Florida
20th-century Latter Day Saint temples